The Alunoasa is a left tributary of the river Olt in Romania. It flows into the Olt in Sânbotin, Vâlcea County.

References

Rivers of Romania
Rivers of Vâlcea County